The 2020 Adelaide International was a tournament on the 2020 ATP Tour and 2020 WTA Tour. It was played on outdoor hard courts in Adelaide, Australia.

This was the first edition of the tournament, replacing the Sydney International, and took place at the Memorial Drive Tennis Centre from 12 to 18 January 2020.

Points and prize money

Point distribution

Prize money 

1Qualifiers prize money is also the Round of 32 prize money.
*per team

ATP singles main-draw entrants

Seeds 

 1 Rankings are as of 6 January 2020.

Other entrants 
The following players received wildcards into the singles main draw:
  Alex Bolt
  James Duckworth
  Alexei Popyrin

The following players received entry from the qualifying draw:
  Grégoire Barrère
  Federico Delbonis
  Lloyd Harris
  Tommy Paul

The following players received entry as a lucky loser:
  Salvatore Caruso
  Jaume Munar
  Stéphane Robert

Withdrawals 
  Alex de Minaur → replaced by  Jaume Munar
  Novak Djokovic → replaced by  Stéphane Robert
  Lucas Pouille → replaced by  Alexander Bublik
  Fernando Verdasco → replaced by  Salvatore Caruso

ATP doubles main-draw entrants

Seeds 

 1 Rankings are as of 6 January 2020.

Other entrants 
The following pairs received wildcards into the doubles main draw:
  Alex Bolt /  Alexei Popyrin
  Lleyton Hewitt /  Jordan Thompson

WTA singles main-draw entrants

Seeds 

 1 Rankings are as of 6 January 2020.

Other entrants 
The following players received wildcards into the singles main draw:
  Belinda Bencic
  Priscilla Hon 
  Aryna Sabalenka 
  Ajla Tomljanović

The following players received entry from the qualifying draw:
  Viktorija Golubic
  Daria Kasatkina 
  Bernarda Pera
  Yulia Putintseva
  Arina Rodionova
  Aliaksandra Sasnovich

The following players received entry as a lucky loser:
  Tímea Babos
  Vitalia Diatchenko
  Tatjana Maria

Withdrawals 
Before the tournament
  Kiki Bertens → replaced by  Vitalia Diatchenko
  Johanna Konta → replaced by  Anastasia Pavlyuchenkova
  Petra Kvitová → replaced by  Tímea Babos
  Petra Martić → replaced by  Hsieh Su-wei
  Alison Riske → replaced by  Tatjana Maria
  Venus Williams → replaced by  Belinda Bencic

WTA doubles main-draw entrants

Seeds 

 1 Rankings are as of 6 January 2020.

Champions

Men's singles 

  Andrey Rublev def.  Lloyd Harris, 6–3, 6–0

Women's singles 

  Ashleigh Barty def.  Dayana Yastremska, 6–2, 7–5

Men's doubles 

 Máximo González /  Fabrice Martin def.  Ivan Dodig /  Filip Polášek, 7–6(14–12), 6–3

Women's doubles 

  Nicole Melichar /  Xu Yifan def.  Gabriela Dabrowski /  Darija Jurak, 2–6, 7–5, [10–5]

References

External links 
 

2020
January 2020 sports events in Australia